John Peters (born in Ashford, Middlesex) is a British disc jockey and long established personality in the East Midlands region. Known for his distinctive voice, he has presented shows on many of the region's radio stations, including Radio Trent, GEM-AM, Saga 106.6 FM and 106.6 Smooth Radio. He currently presents 'Be Bop Gold' on Radio2XS, as well as a show on Gravity FM in Grantham, Lincolnshire on Saturday afternoons, between 2:00 pm and 5:00 pm.

Early career 

He sent a demo to Radio One in 1968 which got a very favourable response from the producers panel, although it didn't lead to a job. In 1972 he applied to Radio Luxembourg (208) and got to perform live in front of the programme director Ken Evans. It came down to two and Mark Wesley got the job.

United Biscuits Network 

John got a call in 1974 from UBN's programme director Adrian Love (son of Geoff Love) while working at a Relay Station operated by the Post Office through which UBN broadcast to factories in Osterley (studio base), Liverpool, Manchester and Tollcross in Glasgow. John had already been to look around and met Roger Day on air and was keen to work there. All of the rules and regulations had been instilled forthrightly, by ex-Radio London favourite Dave Dennis, who would one day be John's boss.

It was like a who's who of future British Broadcasting. Roger Scott, Graham Dene and many more who would later get commercial radio off and running in Great Britain, were all there at UBN. John joined in April 1974, as a whole new team were being assembled to replace the other presenters who were moving on.

In early 1975 came the news that Radio Trent were looking for presenters and Bob Snyder (Radio 270) who was also in the UBN line up, was to become Trent's programme director. John left UBN in May 1975 along with Chris Baird, Peter Quinn and Bob Snyder and headed for Nottingham.

Radio Trent 

He moved to Nottingham in 1975 to help set up the area's first commercial radio station. The station, Radio Trent, was launched on Thursday 3 July 1975, and he hosted its first programme. He spent several years with Trent and hosted many shows including Trent Top 30, which was also later broadcast on Leicester Sound and Derby's Trent 945 (later called Ram FM) before moving to its medium wave service, GEM-AM, when this was established in 1988 as a result of Radio Authority requirements over the simulcasting of programmes on both the AM and FM frequencies.

After several years with GEM, one of his Trent colleagues became involved in the management of a new station, Century FM based in Nottingham, and he was given the chance to return to FM broadcasting. However, he maintained his links with GEM, and eventually became its sole local weekday presenter after the station's purchase by GWR Radio. At Classic Gold GEM (as it was then renamed), he presented the afternoon drivetime show and voiced local announcements.

Freelance Career and Saga 106.6 FM 

In 1999, he became a freelance presenter, hosting shows for a number of stations in the East Midlands region, as well as also doing some behind the scenes engineering work. But in 2003, he made a return to regular presenting after joining Saga 106.6 FM. He became Saga's breakfast presenter, and made it a hat trick by hosting the station's inaugural programme.

He was with Saga throughout its time on air, and was part of the launch team of the station's replacement, 106.6 Smooth Radio. When Smooth Radio began in March 2007, he initially presented its weekday drivetime show. However, from October 2007, Tony Lyman took over the slot, and John Peters became a night time and weekend presenter. The overnight show was networked with some other Smooth stations in June 2008, although he continued to present shows on Saturday afternoon and Sunday morning. He left Smooth at the beginning of 2010. In 2010 he also presented a show on Saturday afternoon with community radio station Gravity FM in Grantham. He can also be heard presenting '60s2XS' on Radio2XS. He is now presenting a morning show on Radio Trent, a reformed online station, with other former Trent Presenters. It was launched on 3 July 2011 to coincide with the launch of the original Radio Trent.

John made a return to breakfast programming from 3 January 2012 on community radio station Gravity FM

During his spare time, John Peters is involved with broadcast electronics, and has built his own station at home. He is often asked to repair equipment for other radio stations. He also enjoys restoring classic cars.

In February 2021, he joined Boom Radio a station aimed at the Baby Boom generation.

External links 
John Peters on Boom Radio
The Vintage Charts on Boom Radio
A biography
Article about John Peters (which includes recordings of him launching Radio Trent and GEM-AM, and presenting on the stations)

Year of birth missing (living people)
Living people
British radio DJs
People from Ashford, Surrey
British radio personalities